Aakirkeby Municipality is a former municipality of Denmark. The municipality covered an area of 186 km2, and had a total population of 6,622. This former municipality is now included in the municipality of Bornholm. The seat of the municipality was in Aakirkeby, which was also the main town of the municipality.

References

Former municipalities of Denmark
Bornholm